The 2024 Under-19 Cricket World Cup qualification will be a series of regional qualification tournaments to determine the final five places at the 2024 Under-19 Cricket World Cup.

Qualified teams

Africa
The African qualifier will have two divisions, with the top three teams from the Division 2 tournament progressing to the main Africa qualification tournament.

Africa - Division 2
The following teams were scheduled to take part in the Division 2 tournament from 30 September to 8 October 2022 in Nigeria. Ghana and Mozambique couldn't participate because of lack of travel documents.

Group A

Group B

Play-offs

Semi-finals

3rd-place play-off

Final

Africa - Division 1
Three teams and the top three teams from the Division 2 tournament will take part in the Division 1 qualifier in Tanzania from 23 to 29 July 2023.

Americas
The Americas qualifier will take place in a single division, with the tournament to be held in Canada from 11 to 17 August 2023 with five teams:

Asia
The Asian qualifier will have two divisions, with the top two teams from the Division 2 tournament progressing to the main Asia qualification tournament.

Asia - Division 2
The following teams took part in the Division 2 tournament, from 29 September to 7 October in Oman.

Group A

Group B

Play-offs

Semi-finals

3rd-place play-off

Final

Asia - Division 1
Three teams and the top two teams from the Division 2 tournament are scheduled to take part in the Division 1 tournament in the United Arab Emirates, to be held from 24 February to 2 March 2023.

East Asia-Pacific
The East Asia-Pacific qualifier will be played in Darwin, Australia, from 12 to 21 June 2023, with seven teams participating in a single division:

Europe
The European qualifier will have two divisions, with the top three teams from the Division 2 tournament progressing to the main European qualification tournament.

Europe - Division 2
The following teams took part in the Division 2 tournament from 5 August to 11 August 2022 on Guernsey.

Group A

Group B

Consolation play-offs

5th Place semi-finals

7th-place play-off

5th-place play-off

Play-offs

Semi-finals

3rd-place play-off

Final

Europe - Division 1
Three teams and the top three teams from the Division 2 tournament are scheduled to take part in the Division 1 tournament, to be held in the Netherlands from 12 to 21 June 2023.

Notes

References

World Cup qualification, 2024
Qualification
Qualification for cricket competitions